Arame macra is a species of beetle in the family Carabidae, the only species in the genus Arame.

References

Lebiinae
Beetles described in 1919